Reto Pirmin Ziegler (born 16 January 1986) is a Swiss professional footballer who plays as a left-back for Swiss Super League club Sion.

Ziegler has played top-flight football in seven different countries. He earned 35 international caps for Switzerland and played at both the 2010 and 2014 FIFA World Cups.

Club career

Early career
In the summer of 2004, Ziegler signed a contract with Tottenham Hotspur, which was initially meant to begin on 1 January 2005, when his contract with Grasshoppers expired. However, the two clubs – reportedly through the initiative of then-Tottenham sporting director Frank Arnesen – agreed to an immediate transfer, and Ziegler joined Spurs in late August of that year.

Tottenham
Despite being just 18 years old, Ziegler soon made his debut and became an important member of the team under both head coach Jacques Santini, who left in October after just a few months in charge, and his successor, Martin Jol. Ziegler featured mostly at left midfield but also played a few matches as left full-back, often switching position with Timothée Atouba, another versatile left-sided player with the team at the time.

Ziegler featured in 31 matches in all competitions that season, including 23 in the Premier League. He showed great promise and improvement, and became popular with the fans for his attack-minded play on the left side and good passing ability. One of his most memorable moments from that season came in the home loss to Arsenal. Near the end of the game, he played a delicate chipped pass to Frédéric Kanouté, who scored to make it 4–5. Another memorable moment was in the 1 January 2005 match against Everton, where he scored his first goal en route to a 5–2 Tottenham win. At the time, it was his only goal of his professional career. At the end of the season, he was named the JSM Young Player of The Year, an award given to a young Tottenham player by its junior fan club.

In the summer of 2005, Ziegler was sent on loan to German Bundesliga club Hamburger SV, where he featured in 11 league matches and 3 UEFA Cup matches, but was criticised by manager Thomas Doll for a poor attitude and rarely played more than a few minutes per match. He was recalled from the loan by Tottenham in January 2006, only to be put back out on loan, this time at another Premier League club, Wigan Athletic. He played with Wigan until the end of the 2005–06 season, receiving five starts and five substitute appearances in the Premier League and one start in the FA Cup, performing well but not spectacularly. He also appeared as a substitute in the 2006 Football League Cup Final against Manchester United, a 4–0 defeat.

Ziegler returned to Tottenham for the 2006–07 season and featured in four matches, including starts in the League Cup against Milton Keynes Dons and in the UEFA Cup against Slavia Prague, as well as a substitute appearance against Manchester United in the Premier League. On 31 January 2007, he joined Italian Serie A club Sampdoria on loan until the end of the season.

Sampdoria

On 18 February 2007, Ziegler played his first Serie A match for Sampdoria against Parma. He scored his first goal in his tenth Serie A appearance for the club against Messina on 21 April 2007. In May, Spurs brought in young left back Gareth Bale, and Ziegler opted to sign for Sampdoria permanently on 3 July 2007. During his first season, he was in and out of the starting line-up, and most of his appearances were substitutions.

Ziegler finally managed to retain his place more regularly during the first half of the 2009–10 season. After a string of substitute appearances, he became first-choice left back. During the winter transfer window, he was linked with a move to Juventus. Having just secured his place in the starting 11, he refuted the transfer rumours saying that he wanted to continue his run in the starting line-up in hopes of being selected for the upcoming FIFA World Cup with Switzerland.

Since his contract would expire on 30 June 2011, in January 2011, Ziegler was linked to Milan, as Sampdoria opted to gain some cash. However, he did not leave. Instead, Sampdoria sold its striker Giampaolo Pazzini and let Antonio Cassano leave as a free agent. The team subsequently performed poorly and were eventually relegated to Serie B.

Juventus
Ziegler joined Juventus on a free transfer on 26 May 2011, having signed a four-year contract. He passed a medical on 25 May.

Fenerbahçe

On 2 September 2011, Fenerbahçe announced they were holding discussions with Juventus and Ziegler to loan him for the 2011–12 season. The next day, it was announced that all parties had reached an agreement for his loan. On 22 April 2012, Ziegler scored the first goal in the derby match against Galatasaray, which Fenerbahçe won 2–1.

Lokomotiv Moscow
After his spell with Fenerbahçe, Ziegler was loaned to Russian Premier League side Lokomotiv Moscow.

Fenerbahçe (second spell)
Ziegler returned on loan to Fenerbahçe on 31 January 2013 until the end of the 2012–13 season.

Sassuolo
On 20 August 2013, Sassuolo confirmed it had acquired Ziegler on loan from Juventus for an undisclosed period and fee.

Sion
On 2 February 2015, Ziegler transferred to Sion in his native Switzerland, signing a six-month contract until the end of the season. He would later sign a new contract with Sion and would play for the club until the end of the 2016–17 season.

FC Dallas
On 2 January 2018, MLS club FC Dallas announced the signing of Ziegler. In the 2018 season, he was the club's primary starter at left center-back. He scored four goals and was sent off a team-high three times. Ziegler's contract with Dallas expired following their 2020 season.

Lugano
On 25 February 2021, Ziegler joined FC Lugano.

Return to Sion
On 25 December 2022, Ziegler signed a 1.5-year contract with Sion.

International career
Ziegler is a former youth international and was in the Switzerland U-17 squad that won the 2002 U-17 European Championships.

Ziegler made his full debut for Switzerland in a 2006 FIFA World Cup qualification match against France on 26 March 2005, helping his team secure a point through a 0–0 draw at the Stade de France. He gained two more caps before drifting out of the frame and was not named to Switzerland's squad for the 2006 World Cup.

For the Swiss U-21 team, he scored a late free-kick against the Netherlands in September 2008 to send Switzerland through to the play-off round of the 2009 UEFA European Under-21 Championship.

On 19 November 2008, Ziegler scored his only senior goal for Switzerland, a powerful left-footed strike against Finland which won the Swiss the match, 1–0. He was selected for the 2010 World Cup squad. He started at left back and played the full 90 minutes in all three matches in the group stage. Switzerland did not advance out of the group. Ziegler was selected again for Switzerland's 2014 World Cup squad. This time, however, he did not appear in any matches.

Personal life
Ziegler's brother Ronald also played as a professional footballer, including for Swiss side ES FC Malley.

Career statistics

Club

International
Score and result list Switzerland's goal tally first, score column indicates score after Ziegler goal.

Honours
Grasshoppers
 Nationalliga A: 2003
 Swiss Cup finalist: 2003–04

Wigan Athletic
 League Cup finalist: 2006

Fenerbahçe
 Turkish Cup: 2011–12. 2012–13
 Süper Lig runner-up: 2011–12, 2012–13

Sion
 Swiss Cup: 2014–15

Lugano
Swiss Cup: 2021–22

Switzerland U17
 UEFA U-17 European Champion: 2002

References

External links
 
 
 

1986 births
Living people
Footballers from Geneva
Swiss men's footballers
Association football defenders
Switzerland international footballers
Switzerland youth international footballers
Switzerland under-21 international footballers
2010 FIFA World Cup players
2014 FIFA World Cup players
Premier League players
Serie A players
Swiss Super League players
Bundesliga players
Süper Lig players
Russian Premier League players
Major League Soccer players
Grasshopper Club Zürich players
FC Lausanne-Sport players
Servette FC players
Tottenham Hotspur F.C. players
Hamburger SV players
Wigan Athletic F.C. players
U.C. Sampdoria players
Juventus F.C. players
Fenerbahçe S.K. footballers
FC Lokomotiv Moscow players
U.S. Sassuolo Calcio players
FC Sion players
FC Luzern players
FC Dallas players
FC Lugano players
Swiss expatriate footballers
Swiss expatriate sportspeople in England
Expatriate footballers in England
Swiss expatriate sportspeople in Germany
Expatriate footballers in Germany
Swiss expatriate sportspeople in Italy
Expatriate footballers in Italy
Swiss expatriate sportspeople in Turkey
Expatriate footballers in Turkey
Swiss expatriate sportspeople in Russia
Expatriate footballers in Russia